Kunitz-type protease inhibitor 2 is an enzyme inhibitor that in humans is encoded by the SPINT2 gene.
SPINT2 is a transmembrane protein with two extracellular Kunitz domains to inhibit serine proteases. This gene is a presumed tumor suppressor by inhibiting HGF activator which prevents the formation of active hepatocyte growth factor. Mutations in SPINT2 could result in congenital sodium diarrhea (CSD).

References

Further reading

External links